The White Rabbit Gallery is an contemporary art museum located in the Sydney inner-city suburb of , New South Wales, Australia.

Description
The gallery, which was founded in 2009 by Judith Neilson, is located in a former warehouse and Rolls-Royce service depot. The gallery holds two exhibitions a year, focusing on works by contemporary Chinese artists.

Gallery

References

External links

 
 
 
 

Contemporary art galleries in Australia
Art museums and galleries in Sydney
Chippendale, New South Wales